Eskmeals is a former railway station in the Eskmeals area of the Cumbrian coast, England. It was situated at the southern end of Eskmeals Viaduct. It served a scattered farming community.

History
It was opened in stages, and the section between  through Eskmeals to  opened either on 19 July 1850 or on 8 July 1850. On 28 October 1850 the last section between Bootle and Broughton-in-Furness was formally opened.

The coastal line through Eskmeals survived Beeching and carries a regular all stations service to this day. Passenger services were withdrawn by the British Transport Commission on 3 August 1959. The buildings remained intact until the early 1980s but have since been demolished; the disused and overgrown platforms survive and can be seen from passing trains.

Services 
In 1922 five trains in each direction called at Eskmeals, Monday to Saturday.

Two all stations trains in each direction between Carnforth and Whitehaven called on Sundays.

References

Notes

Sources

External links 

Disused railway stations in Cumbria
Former Furness Railway stations
Railway stations in Great Britain opened in 1850
Railway stations in Great Britain closed in 1959
Bootle, Cumbria